Viking is the second and final studio album by the American punk rock band Lars Frederiksen and the Bastards. It was released on July 13, 2004 via Hellcat Records. The album peaked at #17 on the Independent Albums and #18 on the Heatseekers Albums.

Track listing

Personnel

 Lars Frederiksen - vocals, guitar
 Craig Fairbaugh - rhythm guitar, vocals
 Jason Woods - bass, vocals
 Gordy Carbone - vocals
 Scott Abels - drums
 Tim Armstrong - vocals (track 11), guitar (track 16), backing vocals, producer, additional engineer, photography, artwork
 Robert Aston - vocals (track 5)
 Chris Dugan - backing vocals, assistant engineer
 Brett Reed - backing vocals
 Dan Hodge - backing vocals
 Lochlan McHale - backing vocals
 Matt Freeman - mandolin
 Carl Wheeler - Wurlitzer electric piano & Hammond B-3 organ (track 16)
 Alen C. Agadhzhanyan - strings & violin (track 16)
 Dave Carlock - Hammond B-3 organ (track 11), additional engineer
 Michael Rosen - engineer
 Alex Reverberi - assistant engineer
 Tim Baker - mastering
 Brett Gurewitz - mixing
 Tom D. Kline - artwork
 Rachel Tejada - artwork
 Tim Lehi - illustration

Charts

Release history

References

External links 

2004 albums
Hellcat Records albums
Lars Frederiksen and the Bastards albums